Jordan Clark may refer to:
 Jordan Clark (cricketer) (born 1990), English cricketer
 Jordan Clark (English footballer) (born 1993), English footballer
 Jordan Clark (actress) (born 1991), Canadian dancer and winner of So You Think You Can Dance Canada (season 4)
 Jordan Clark (Australian footballer) (born 2000), Australian rules footballer

See also
 Jordan Clarke (disambiguation)